Mordellistena amabilis is a species of beetle in the genus Mordellistena of the family Mordellidae. It was discovered in 1875.

References

amabilis
Beetles described in 1875